Grotjahn is a surname. Notable people with the surname include:

Mark Grotjahn (born 1968), American painter
Martin Grotjahn (1904–1990), German-born American psychoanalyst